Orange Nash Stoddard (August 23, 1812—February 10, 1892) was a professor of natural science at Miami University and the College of Wooster who served as president pro tem of Miami University in 1854.
 
He was born in Lisle, New York, and received his A.B. degree from Union College 1834.  He received an honorary LL.D. degrees at Monmouth College.  He joined the Miami faculty in 1845 and among his more prominent students were Benjamin Harrison, David Swing, John Willock Noble and Whitelaw Reid.  At Miami, he became a faculty member of Phi Delta Theta and was known affectionately as "Stoddy" and "the Little Wizard" by his students.  Stoddard and his wife, Eliza lived in a historic home at 16 South Campus Avenue in Oxford where they raised their three daughters who graduated from the Oxford Female College.  He resigned in 1870 to assume a professorship at the College of Wooster where he died in 1892 while serving as professor emeritus.

Stoddard Hall on the Miami campus was named for him in 1937.

External links

Stoddard photo at Miami University Archives

1812 births
1892 deaths
Presidents of Miami University
Miami University faculty
Union College (New York) alumni
People from Lisle, New York
Monmouth College alumni